The Alabama cave shrimp (Palaemonias alabamae) is a species of shrimp in the family Atyidae, found only in caves in the state of Alabama.

Conservation status
Palaemonias alabamae is listed as an endangered species both on the IUCN Red List, and since September 7, 1988, under the U.S. Endangered Species Act.

Distribution
The Alabama cave shrimp is only known from five caves, all in Madison County, Alabama. Shelta Cave is the species' type locality, but viable populations have only been confirmed in Bobcat Cave and the complex comprising Hering Cave, Glover Cave and Brazelton Cave.

Ecology
P. alabamae occurs in cave pools with silty bottoms. Predators of the Alabama cave shrimp include the southern cavefish Typhlichthys subterraneus, the Tennessee cave salamander Gyrinophilus palleucus, various crayfish species, bullfrogs and raccoons.

Taxonomy
The closest relative of the Alabama cave shrimp is the Kentucky cave shrimp, Palaemonias ganteri, which lives in Mammoth Cave National Park, Kentucky. The two species can be distinguished by size (P. alabamae being larger than P. ganteri), the longer rostrum in P. alabamae, and the greater number of spines on the rostrum of P. alabamae.

References

Atyidae
Crustaceans of the United States
Cave shrimp
Endemic fauna of Alabama
Freshwater crustaceans of North America
Madison County, Alabama
Crustaceans described in 1961
Endangered fauna of the United States
ESA endangered species